Absolute number may refer to:

 Quantity, a property that can exist as a multitude or magnitude

Mathematics
 Absolute value, the non-negative value of a real number without regard to its sign
 Absolute error, the absolute value of an approximation error in some data
 Absolute difference, the absolute value of the difference of two real numbers
 Absolute pseudoprime, a class of pseudoprimes that come from Fermat's little theorem
 Absolute scale, system of measurement that begins at a zero point and progresses in only one direction

See also 
 Absolute zero, the lowest limit of the thermodynamic temperature scale
 Absolute magnitude, a measure of the luminosity of a celestial object
 Relative change and difference, used to compare two quantities taking into account the "sizes" of the things being compared
 Absolute (disambiguation)
 Number (disambiguation)